Eulithis serrataria, the serrated eulithis, is a species of moth in the family Geometridae. It was first described by William Barnes and James Halliday McDunnough in 1917 and it is found in North America.

The MONA or Hodges number for Eulithis serrataria is 7208.

References

Further reading

 
 

Hydriomenini
Articles created by Qbugbot
Moths described in 1917